Gama is a small town in western-central Senegal. It is located in the Kaolack Region.

Nearby towns and villages include Gordilene (1.0 nm), Ali Gane (2.2 nm), Keur Deuri (2.2 nm), Keur Tierno Tala (2.2 nm), Ndiayene Bagana (1.9 nm), Kebe Lanim(2.2 nm), Dimbe Korki (1.4 nm), Keur Modou (1.4 nm), Nianguene (2.0 nm), Medina Diognik (2.2 nm).

References

External links
Satellite map at Maplandia.com

Populated places in Kaolack Region